Los Canarios were a Spanish pop rock (prog rock later) band from Canary Islands founded by Eduardo "Teddy" Bautista in 1964.

Career
The band started off in Las Palmas as Canaries performing soul music and rhythm & blues with lyrics in English.
Their first album Flying High with The Canaries (1967) was only released in the US, receiving a belated edition in Spain, in 1985.

The singles "Get on Your Knees" and "Free Yourself" became hits in Spain, as a second LP entitled Libérate! was released in 1970, but they had to disband momentarily when Bautista entered the military service. 
"Get on Your Knees", specifically, reached triple gold status.

Through the first half of the 70s the style of the band became closer to prog rock, as Bautista increasingly experimented with synthesizers and electronic music.
All this came to fruition by means of Ciclos (1974), a double album that came like a symphonic rock adaptation of Vivaldi's "Four Seasons".

The group disbanded in 1974.

Discography
Flying High with The Canaries (1967)
Libérate! (1970)
Canarios vivos!!!! (1972) 
Ciclos (1974)

Members
Teddy Bautista
Germán Pérez
Graham Bircumshaw
Álvaro Yébenes
Ricky Morales
"Tato" Luzardo
"Nano" Muñoz
Alfredo Mahiques
Vicente Mahiques

References

Spanish musical groups
Musical groups established in 1964
Spanish pop music groups
Spanish rock music groups